Felix Kalapu (born 27 September 1999) is a New Zealand rugby union player who plays for the  in Super Rugby. His playing position is lock or flanker. He was named in the Force squad for the 2023 Super Rugby Pacific season. He was also named in the  squad for the 2022 Bunnings NPC.

Kalapu was born in Auckland, and attended Auckland Grammar School. After featuring for  during the 2022 pre-season, he joined Old Glory DC for the 2022 Major League Rugby season. He signed for the Force in August 2022 on a three-year deal.

Reference list

External links
itsrugby.co.uk profile

New Zealand rugby union players
Living people
1999 births
Rugby union locks
Rugby union flankers
Auckland rugby union players
Old Glory DC players
North Harbour rugby union players
Western Force players
Rugby union players from Auckland